The 2014 CIT Paraguay Open was a professional tennis tournament played on outdoor clay courts. It was the first edition of the tournament which was part of the 2014 ITF Women's Circuit, offering a total of $50,000 in prize money. It took place in Asunción, Paraguay, on 17–23 November 2014.

Singles entrants

Seeds 

 1 Rankings as of 10 November 2014

Other entrants 
The following players received wildcards into the singles main draw:
  Gabriela Ferreira Sanabria
  Sara Giménez
  Cindy Oest
  Arianna María Stagni Lailla

The following players received entry from the qualifying draw:
  Lauren Albanese
  Carolina Alves
  Csilla Argyelán
  Sofía Luini

Champions

Singles 

  Bianca Botto def.  Florencia Molinero 6–3, 6–2

Doubles 

  Sofía Luini /  Guadalupe Pérez Rojas def.  Anastasia Pivovarova /  Patricia Maria Țig 6–3, 6–3

External links 
  
 2014 CIT Paraguay Open at ITFtennis.com

2014 ITF Women's Circuit
2014 in Paraguayan sport
Tennis in Paraguay